Zenón de Somodevilla y Bengoechea, 1st Marquess of Ensenada (April 20, 1702 in Alesanco near LogroñoDecember 2, 1781), commonly known as the Marquess of Ensenada, was a Spanish statesman.

Biography
Little is known of Somodevilla's parents, Francisco de Somodevilla and his wife, Francisca de Bengoechea, nor is anything known of his own life prior to entering the civil administration of the Spanish navy as a clerk in 1720. He served in administrative capacities in Ceuta in that year and in the reoccupation of Oran in 1731. His ability was recognized by Don José Patiño, the chief minister of King Philip V, who promoted him to supervise work at the naval arsenal at Ferrol, the main base of the Spanish Navy's Maritime Department of the North since the time of the early Bourbons.

Somodevilla was also involved in the endeavors by the Spanish government to elevate the king's sons by his marriage to Elizabeth Farnese, Charles and Philip, on the thrones of Naples and Parma respectively. In 1736 Charles, afterwards King Charles III of Spain, conferred on Somodevilla the Neapolitan title of Marqués de la Ensenada. While an ensenada is a roadstead or a small bay, some of the ancestry-conscious upper-classes and nobility of the court, envious of the rise of this upstart self-made man delighted in the pun, that the name from the title can be phonetically divided into three Spanish words "en si nada," which means "in himself nothing." Ensenada was one of the new type of royal advisor, the talented man of no social standing.

In 1742 Ensenada became Secretary of State and War to Philip, duke of Parma. The following year, on April 11, 1743, after Patinos's successor Campillo died suddenly, as Marquess of Ensenada, he was chosen by Philip V as Minister of Finance, War, the Navy and the Indies (i.e. the ultramarine portion of the Spanish Empire). Ensenada met the nomination with a nolo episcopari, professing that he was incapable of filling the four posts at once. His reluctance was dismissed by the king, and he became prime minister at the age of forty-one. During the remainder of the king's reign, which lasted till July 11, 1746, and under his successor Ferdinand VI until 1754, Ensenada was the prime minister, leading the country to victory alongside France and Prussia in the War of the Austrian Succession.

His administration is notable in Spanish history for the vigor of his policy of internal reform. He drew up reports on the finances and general condition of the country for the new king on his accession, and again after peace was made with Britain at Aix-la-Chapelle on October 18, 1748. Under his direction the rule of the Bourbon kings became more centralized, public works were undertaken, shipping was encouraged, trade was fostered and numbers of young Spaniards were sent abroad for education. Ensenada was a regalist, who sought to increase the power of the crown and bring the Catholic Church more under its control.  He initiated reforms that "were intended to redefine the clergy as a professional class of spiritual specialists with fewer judicial and administrative responsibilities and less independence than in Hapsburg times." From 1749 onwards Ensenada encouraged one of the most important census and statistical investigations in the Europe of his time, known as Catastro of Ensenada, as a first step of a broader reform on taxes. Ensenada joined with Jorge Juan and Antonio de Ulloa in harsh criticism of the functioning of the Spanish Empire in Spanish America, targeting corruption and inefficiency. Juan and Ulloa's secret report was a devastating indictment of the American-born Spanish elites (criollos) and the incompetence of colonial rule.  This report was to influence crown policy in what became known as the Bourbon Reforms.

Ensenada was a strong supporter of a French alliance and of a policy hostile to Britain. Sir Benjamin Keene, the British minister, supported the Spanish court in opposing Ensenada, and succeeded in preventing him from adding the foreign office to the others which he held. Ensenada would probably have fallen sooner but for the support he received from the Portuguese queen, Barbara. In 1754 he offended her by opposing an exchange of Spanish and Portuguese colonial possessions in America which she favored. Following a scandal at court resulting from a conspiracy between anglophile José de Carvajal and the British ambassador to Spain, he was arrested by the king's order on July 20, 1754, and was sacked as prime minister upon Carvajal's death (see Enlightenment Spain). He was sent into mild confinement at Granada; he was afterwards allowed to relocate to Puerto de Santa Maria.

On the accession of Charles III in 1759, he was released and allowed to return to Madrid. The new king named him as member of a commission appointed to reform the taxation system. Ensenada soon offended the king. On April 18, 1766, he was again exiled from court, and ordered to go to Medina del Campo. He remained here until his death on 2 December 1781 and was never again involved in public life.

See also
History of Spain (1700-1810)
Regalism

References

Further reading
 For the conspiracy against Ensenada and his disgrace see Diego Téllez Alarcia, D. Ricardo Wall. Aut Caesar aut nullus (Madrid, 2008). Especially pages 171 to 192.
 Didier Ozanam y Diego Téllez Alarcia (eds.), Misión en París. Correspondencia del duque de Huéscar y el marqués de la Ensenada (1746–1749) (Logroño, 2010).

1702 births
1781 deaths
Marquesses of Ensenada
Knights of the Golden Fleece of Spain
Antiziganism in Spain
Economy and finance ministers of Spain